Hendrik Pieter "Henri" Marchant (12 February 1869 - 12 May 1956) was a Dutch politician who co-founded the Free-thinking Democratic League (VDB) and served as a member of the House of Representatives from 1900 until 1933, after which he was Minister of Education, Arts, and Science until 1935.

Marchant was active in local politics in Deventer before elected to the House of Representatives in 1900 for the Liberal Union (LU). In 1901 he was one of the founding members of the VDB, a merger of the Radical League and the left wing  of the LU. In 1916 he became leader of the VDB's parliamentary group.

In 1919 his private member's bill lead to women's suffrage in the Netherlands. His main political opponent was Hendrik Colijn, whose cabinet he helped come to a premature end in 1925. Marchant subsequently was appointed formateur but failed to form a new, centre-left cabinet.
In 1933 he accepted the position of Minister of Education, Arts, and Science in the Second Colijn cabinet. He introduced a spelling reform that bore his name ("spelling-Marchant"). He resigned in 1935 when he lost his party's support following the disclosure of his secret baptism.

References

Sources
 
 

1869 births
1956 deaths
People from Deventer
Dutch politicians
1930s in the Netherlands